Drinjaković is a Serbian surname. Notable people with the surname include:

Biserka Jevtimijević Drinjaković (born 1969), Serbian businessman

Serbian surnames